The Sanwalia ji temples of the Dark Krishna are situated on the Chittorgarh–Udaipur Highway, Rajasthan, India, at the town of Bhadsora, Mandaphiya and Chapar, about 40 kilometres from Chittorgarh. The deity also known as Shri Sanwaria Seth which is very renowned in Hinduism.

Located 40  from Chittorgarh – the historic city of valor and devotion – Mandaphiya is now known as Shri Sanwaliya Dham (The residence of Lord Krishna) and is second only to Shrinath Ji Temple, Nathdwara to the followers of the Vaishnav Sect. People believe that all their desires are fulfilled by their visit to Shri Sanwaliya Seth's Darbar (Court of Shri Sanwaliya Ji).

History 
In Mewar, that in the year 1840, a cowherd named Bholaram Gurjar dreamed of burying three divine idols underground at Chhapar in Bagund village;  Upon excavating the site, three beautiful idols of Lord Krishna were discovered, as depicted in the dream.  One of the idols was taken to Mandafiya, one to Bhadsoda and the third to Chhapar in Bagund village, at the same place where it was found.  All three places became temples.  These three temples are located close to each other within a distance of 5 km.  Three temples of Sanwaliya ji became famous and since then a large number of devotees come to visit them.  Among these three temples, Mandafiya Temple is recognized as Sanwaliya Ji Dham (Abode of Sanwalia). One of the statues was taken to Mandaphiya, one to Bhadsoda and the third remained at Chapar, at the very place where it was found. All three locations became temples. These three temples are located close to each other, within the 5 km distance. The three temples of Sanwaliya Ji became renowned and devotees visit them in large numbers since then. Among these three temples, Mandaphia Temple is recognized as the Sanwalia Ji Dham (abode of Sanwaliya).

According to a legend, these idols were made by Naga monks, which were hidden in the ground for fear of the invaders.

Near this place is Bhadasoda village which has a history of more than 1000 years. Pritha, the sister of Veer Prithviraja Chauhan, the ruler of Ajmer and Delhi, was married to Rana Samar Singh of Chittor. After marriage, the slaves and the Charan chieftain who came to Chittor with Prtiha  were given 12 villages in Jagir by Rana Samar Singh. These villages also included Bhadasoda village

Puraji Bhagat, the very famous householder saint of the Suthar caste, lived in Bhadasoda. Under his direction, these idols were handled and kept safe. The second idol was taken to the village of Mandafia, a temple was constructed there too, which became famous with time. Even today, thousands of travelers from far and wide come to visit every year.

Special Festivals 
Every year all major festival avam festivals are celebrated in the temple. it goes like this :-

 Maha-Shivratri
 Holi and Phooladol Festival
 Navratri
 Ram-Navami
 Hanuman Jubilee
 Greening Amavasya
 Brahmashtami
 Ganesh-Chaturthi
 Jaljhulani Ekadashi (3-day huge fair to the Bhadrapad Shukla Sides, Ekadashi Vadashi every year)
 Dipawali and Annakoot.

References

External links
 Temple Website

Hindu temples in Rajasthan
Tourist attractions in Chittorgarh district